South Normanton Football Club was a football club based in South Normanton, Derbyshire.

History
The club was formed as a feeder club of South Normanton Athletic. They joined the South Division of the Central Midlands League in 2016 and entered the FA Vase for the first time in the 2017–18 season. However, in March 2018 the club resigned from the league, resulting in their record being expunged.

Records
Best FA Vase performance: First qualifying round, 2017–18

References

Defunct football clubs in Derbyshire
Central Midlands Football League
2016 establishments in England
Association football clubs established in 2016
2018 disestablishments in England
Association football clubs disestablished in 2018
Defunct football clubs in England